Charles Francis Boynton (April 19, 1906 - July 3, 1999) was bishop of the Episcopal Diocese of Puerto Rico, serving from 1947 to 1951. He served later as a suffragan bishop of the Episcopal Diocese of New York from 1951 to 1969. In 1990 he joined the Anglican Catholic Church.

Biography
Boynton was born on April 19, 1906, in Geneseo, New York. the son of the Reverend Charles Homer Boynton. He studied at the Williams College from where he graduated with a Bachelor of Arts. Later he gained his Bachelor of Sacred Theology from General Theological Seminary.

He was ordained deacon in 1932 and priest in 1933. He served on the faculty of Christ School in Arden, North Carolina. In 1939 he became chaplain at St Francis House at the University of Wisconsin, while in 1941 he was appointed priest-in-charge of St Andrew's Church in Mayagüez, Puerto Rico, where he remained till 1943.

In October 1943 he was elected Coadjutor Bishop of Puerto Rico and was consecrated on January 2, 1944, by Charles B. Colmore in St John's Cathedral. He succeeded as diocesan bishop in 1947.

In 1951 he was elected Suffragan Bishop of New York, a post he retained till his resignation in 1969. In 1978 he resigned his episcopacy from the Episcopal Church. He joined the conservative and breakaway Anglican Catholic Church in 1990. He died on July 3, 1999. He was married to Helen Beecher Fowler. They had two children, Carol Boynton and Frederick Boynton. After the death of his first wife, he eventually married Dori Watson.

External links 
Sermon Preached at the Consecration of the Venerable David Richards as Suffragan Bishop of the Diocese of Albany on Thursday, July 19th, 1951 at the Cathedral of All Saints Albany, New York
Retired Episcopal Bishop Joins Anglican Catholic Church
Obituary -- Charles Francis Boynton

1906 births
1999 deaths
20th-century American Episcopalians
American expatriate bishops
Episcopal bishops of Puerto Rico
20th-century American clergy
Williams College alumni